Géza Ütő (9 October 1929 – 6 March 2020) was a Hungarian rower. He competed at the 1956 Summer Olympics in Melbourne with the men's coxless four where they were eliminated in the round one repêchage.

References

1929 births
2020 deaths
Hungarian male rowers
Olympic rowers of Hungary
Rowers at the 1956 Summer Olympics
Rowers from Budapest
European Rowing Championships medalists